DXWZ (94.3 FM), broadcasting as 94.3 Wild FM, is a radio station owned and operated by UM Broadcasting Network. The station's studio and transmitter are located along Osmena Ext., Brgy. 26, Cagayan de Oro. It operates 24 hours a day. It was formerly known as Wild Zee.

References

Radio stations in Cagayan de Oro
Radio stations established in 1991
1991 establishments in the Philippines